Wang Yang (Pinyin: Wāng Yáng; born 5 March 1955) is a retired Chinese politician who served as the chairman of the National Committee of the Chinese People's Political Consultative Conference from 2018 to 2023. Previously, Wang was one of the four vice premiers of China in premier Li Keqiang's Cabinet between 2013 and 2018. Until December 2012, he served as the Communist Party secretary of Guangdong, the province's top political office. He served as the Communist Party secretary of Chongqing, an interior municipality, from 2005 to 2007. Wang also held a seat on the Politburo of the Chinese Communist Party from 2007 to 2022, and the Politburo Standing Committee from 2017 to 2022.

Early life
Wang was born in Suzhou, Anhui, to an ordinary urban working-class family. His father was a manual labourer. Between 1972 and 1976, he worked as a food processing factory hand before being promoted to supervisor. He joined the Chinese Communist Party in 1975. He subsequently joined the local Party School as an instructor, before going on to study political economics at the dawn of Deng Xiaoping's economic reforms at the Central Party School in 1979. He returned to his hometown as a party policy instructor before joining the local Communist Youth League organization – where he would ascend to the provincial organization by 1984. He then moved on to work as the Deputy Director and Director of the Anhui Provincial Sports Bureau until 1988.

His first tenure with civil administration was in Tongling, Anhui, beginning in 1988. He would serve on the municipal administration as its deputy party secretary, acting mayor, and mayor, while also concurrently attempting to earn a degree in political administration at the Central Party School. He would rise to become the provincial Governor's assistant the following year, and promoted to Vice-Governor of Anhui between 1993 and 1998. He was finally sent to work in the central government as the deputy head of the National Development and Reform Commission, and then as deputy secretary general of the State Council between 2003 and 2005, in charge of the day-to-day administrative work of the State Council General Office.

Chongqing
Wang served as the Party Committee Secretary in Chongqing, a western interior municipality, from 2005 to 2007. Wang's track record in Chongqing earned him national attention, for his work of bringing a geographically remote and relatively underdeveloped region onto the international scene. In Chongqing, Wang won praise for handling a sensitive urban demolition case. He was also the pioneer of media reforms in the municipality. Since 1 January 2007, Chongqing media no longer gave priority to the activities of the city's municipal leaders in daily news broadcasts, instead focusing on stories about ordinary people, which resulted in an increase of coverage about agriculture, rural life and rural migrant workers.

In 2007, Wang was succeeded as Chongqing party secretary by Bo Xilai. After taking Wang's place, Bo orchestrated a sweeping campaign against alleged local gangsters. Political observers noted that Bo's "crime"-fighting efforts were implicitly critical of Wang Yang, since Wang may now be criticized for tolerating the "mafia"-related corruption of the police and judiciary of Chongqing, and for tolerating organized crime in general. Bo Xilai was subsequently arrested for a variety of charges and sentenced to life imprisonment, and official evaluation of his "crime"-fighting campaign recognizes that it encompassed gross violations of civil rights, with almost 1,000 people sent to labor camps, and served to a large extent as a tool for Bo Xilai to consolidate power and take over economic resources.

Guangdong
As part of a party-wide reshuffle of regional leaders, Wang Yang was slated to become Party Committee Secretary of Guangdong after the 17th Party Congress. He took on the post formally in November 2007. As the post was considered one of the most important regional leadership offices in China, he also earned a seat on the Communist Party's Politburo, the country's second-highest ruling council. Wang's entry to the Politburo came as a surprise to some observers, given that prior to 2007, he had not even held full membership in the Central Committee, a larger body composed of around 200 members consisting mostly of provincial- and minister-level party officials.

In Guangdong, Wang increasingly branded himself as a bold reformer. He was instrumental in pushing Guangdong province, already dubbed China's "breeding ground of reform", towards even greater economic and political freedoms. Additionally, Wang sought to diversify the province's economy away from manufacturing, and make Shenzhen an innovation hub for China's new economy.  Wang's unique leadership style set him apart from normally colourless and risk-averse provincial administrators who parrot the party line.  He was often compared to Bo Xilai by political observers, as both Wang and Bo were seen as rising stars of Chinese politics vying for top office. Both held important regional offices that could be used as 'testing grounds' for policies that could eventually be implemented nationally.

Amid the global financial crisis of 2008, Guangdong faced a mass wave of bankruptcies of small to medium-sized enterprises (SMEs).  In response, Wang said that his administration would not intervene to prevent bankruptcies.  He remarked that unprofitable SMEs are "not productive and will eventually be eliminated by the market."  After a visit to the Pearl River Delta by Premier Wen Jiabao, who was in favour of protecting small and medium-sized enterprises in order to prevent unemployment, the Wang-led Guangdong government showed resistance adhering to central government directives which called for heavier state intervention.

In 2009, Wang wished to re-instate the May Day week-long holiday in Guangdong. The holiday was removed from the calendar by central authorities a few years earlier. However, the decision was subsequently reversed by the central government.

Wang won international praise for his handling of the Wukan protests in 2011. Wukan is a fishing village under the jurisdiction of the city of Shanwei; thousands of villagers rose in protest against what they saw as insufficient compensation for local residents during the sale of land by officials. Under Wang's leadership the provincial government offered concessions to protesting villagers and allowed local elections for a new village chief.

During his term in Guangdong, Wang also became an outspoken critic of corruption and nepotism, reputedly putting him at odds with the family of the late general Ye Jianying. Ye's family had extensive economic and political interests in Guangdong and retained massive influence among the country's political elites, particularly the descendants of early Communist revolutionaries, better known as "Princelings". As a result, Wang's detractors considered him "politically unreliable", suggesting that Wang showed too much boldness in upstaging the status quo, under which most Princelings had benefited immensely. Wang was widely touted in the lead up the 18th National Congress of the Chinese Communist Party as a rising star, likely slated for Politburo Standing Committee (PSC) membership in 2012. However, it was said that Wang's poor relations with the Ye family reduced his chances of entering the PSC.  Ultimately, the 18th PSC was dominated by people described as Princelings.

Central Government
While Wang did not make it to the pinnacle of Chinese political life as was predicted early on by some observers, he was able to 'renew' his Politburo membership for another five-year term at the 18th Party Congress. He subsequently left his leadership post in Guangdong, succeeded by another rising political star, Hu Chunhua. In March 2013, Wang Yang was promoted to Vice Premier in Li Keqiang's government at the 2013 National People's Congress, overseeing portfolios of agriculture, water management, commerce, tourism, and poverty reduction.

In his capacity as Vice Premier, Wang frequently met with international dignitaries and accompanied Xi Jinping or Li Keqiang on trips abroad. However, his periodic displays of bold political views seem to have receded to the background as the new group of party leaders gradually coalesced around Xi Jinping's ideology. Following the 4th Plenum of the 18th Central Committee held in October 2014, Wang published an article on the party mouthpiece People's Daily in which he praised the legal reforms discussed at the plenum and said that China will learn from its own culture and experience and will never "copy models or philosophies of other countries" when it comes to legal reform.

Wang has taken on several important roles in heading ad hoc policy coordination steering committees known as Central Leading Groups. He has, since 2013, been the leader of the Leading Group on Intellectual Property and Counterfeit Goods, the leader of the State Council Leading Group on Poverty Reduction, and the deputy leader of the Commission on Food Safety. He was also named in 2014 as the deputy leader of the Leading Group for Advancing the Development of One Belt One Road, and the leader of the Leading Group on Poverty Reduction. Wang was considered a strong candidate for entry into the Politburo Standing Committee at the 19th Party Congress in 2017.

Wang was chosen to be a member of the 19th Politburo Standing Committee, China's top decision-making body, at the 1st Plenary Session of the 19th Central Committee of the Chinese Communist Party on 25 October 2017.

Wang is the head of the Central Committee's Xinjiang Work Coordination Small Group, a body deciding Xinjiang policies. Wang visited Xinjiang in April 2018, March and July, 2019. According to a source quoted by the South China Morning Post, Wang reported to Xi Jinping that measures targeting Muslim ethnic minorities in Xinjiang have triggered widespread discontent among Han Chinese officials and citizens.

During the 20th National Congress of the Chinese Communist Party in October 2022, Wang failed to be elected to the new 20th Central Committee of the Chinese Communist Party which indicates his political retirement.

Political positions and public image 
Wang is often seen as a leading liberal in China's ruling elite, representing a school of thought that advocates for a greater role of the free market, gradual political liberalization, and a government that is more in touch with the needs of ordinary people. Although he has been generally more daring in challenging party orthodoxy compared to his peers, analysts suggest that he is unlikely to directly challenge the party line.

Wang is also seen as an advocate for market-based solutions to economic development. If economic growth were analogous to baking a cake, Wang said that the priority should be to "bake a cake" rather than to divide it, i.e., economic growth takes precedence over wealth re-distribution. This was in stark contrast to the "Chongqing model" advanced by Bo Xilai, which suggests that wealth should be re-distributed fairly first, or that wealth redistribution and economic growth can take place simultaneously. Wang and Bo's opposing views on what was dubbed the "Cake Theory" have been characterized as an increasingly apparent "left-right" ideological divide within China's ruling elite.

Wang is often seen smiling in public and has been known to shun hair dye, unlike most of his colleagues. Wang is also known to make offhand and often humorous remarks in public. As the top economic official representing China at the 2013 U.S.-China Strategic and Economic Dialogue, Wang compared the relationship between China and the United States as that of a married couple. In a session with U.S. Treasury Secretary Jack Lew, Wang remarked "I am aware that the US allows gay marriage, but I don't think Jacob and I have such intentions." He later added that China and the United States should not "choose the path of a divorce", stating, "like that of Wendy Deng and Rupert Murdoch, it is just too expensive".

Personal life 
In 2019, Wang's sole child, Wang Xisha, was reported by the New York Times to have been hired in 2010 by Deutsche Bank partly because of her father's connections. In particular, it was mentioned by an employee at the bank during her application process that Wang Xisha would "have access" to a state-owned automaker in Guangzhou, where Wang Yang was a top government official.

In 2020, Wang Xisha was mentioned again by the New York Times, where it was reported that she bought a US$2 million home in Hong Kong in 2010. She is married to Nicholas Zhang.

Awards and honors
 Order of Friendship (Russia, 2017)

References

External links 

  Biography of Wang Yang, Xinhua News Agency.

1955 births
Living people
Alternate members of the 16th Central Committee of the Chinese Communist Party
Chairpersons of the National Committee of the Chinese People's Political Consultative Conference
Chinese Communist Party politicians from Anhui
Chinese reformers
Delegates to the 19th National Congress of the Chinese Communist Party
Delegates to the 20th National Congress of the Chinese Communist Party
Delegates to the 9th National People's Congress
Delegates to the 10th National People's Congress
Delegates to the 11th National People's Congress
Delegates to the 12th National People's Congress
Delegates to the 13th National People's Congress
People's Republic of China politicians from Anhui
Members of the 17th Politburo of the Chinese Communist Party
Members of the 18th Politburo of the Chinese Communist Party
Members of the 19th Politburo Standing Committee of the Chinese Communist Party
Members of the 13th Chinese People's Political Consultative Conference
Political office-holders in Chongqing
Political office-holders in Guangdong
Politicians from Suzhou, Anhui
University of Science and Technology of China alumni
Vice Premiers of the People's Republic of China